I Wish Someone Were Waiting for Me Somewhere (French: Je voudrais que quelqu'un m'attende quelque part) is a collection of twelve short stories written by Anna Gavalda.

It was written in French and published in 1999. It is the first book published by Anna Gavalda and it was awarded the Prix Contrepoint in 2001.

Reception 
I Wish Someone Were Waiting for Me Somewhere was first published in 1999 under the title Je voudrais que quelqu'un m'attende quelque part that met with both critical acclaim and commercial success, selling more than three-quarters of a million copies in her native France and winning the 2000 Grand prix RTL-Lire.

"Her books have both wit and a whimsical charm" (The Sunday Telegraph).

Adaption

Film 

 2019: I Wish Someone Were Waiting for Me Somewhere by Arnaud Viard.

External links 
 Complete text
 Je voudrais que quelqu'un m'attende quelque part d'Anna Gavalda on Cosmopolitan
 Je voudrais que quelqu'un m'attende quelque part on Le Magazine Littéraire

See also 
 1999 in literature
 Contemporary French literature

1999 short story collections
French short story collections